Greenfield Township is a township in Elk County, Kansas, USA.  As of the 2000 census, its population was 321.

Geography
According to the USGS, it contains one cemetery, Green Lawn.

The streams of Corum Creek, East Fork Caney River and Schrader Branch run through this township.

Transportation
Greenfield Township contains one airport or landing strip, Eaglehead Ranch Airport.

References
 USGS Geographic Names Information System (GNIS)

External links
 US-Counties.com
 City-Data.com

Townships in Elk County, Kansas
Townships in Kansas